The Rapier is an unmanned autonomous helicopter that can provide reconnaissance, surveillance, situational awareness, electronic warfare, aerial fire support and precision targeting support for ground, air and sea forces. VTOL (Vertical Take Off Landing) helicopters are more comfortable for use- take off and land vertically on any kind of terrain (small ships or even vehicles), there is no need for a runway, there is more possibility for monitoring and recording.

The helicopter is designed to carry various payloads such as radar systems, radar confusion transmissions, surveillance equipment (color TV camera, low light level TV camera, thermal imaging camera, laser target designation) and even weapons.

See also
Pegaz 011
High Speed Target Drone
IAI Scout
AAI RQ-7 Shadow

References

Unmanned military aircraft of Serbia
Military Technical Institute Belgrade
Unmanned helicopters
Serbian brands